Ronia, the Robber's Daughter (in the UK, Ronja Rövardotter in Sweden, Ronja Robbersdaughter in the USA) is a Swedish fantasy film which was released to cinemas in Sweden on 14 December 1984, directed by Tage Danielsson, based on the 1981 novel of the same title by Astrid Lindgren, and adapted for the screen by Lindgren herself.

When the film was broadcast on television two years after its cinema premiere, the film was twenty minutes longer and uncensored (the cinema release allowed viewing from 7 years and older). This spurred a debate where critics asked if film was more harmful in cinemas than on television. The film was selected as the Swedish entry for the Best Foreign Language Film at the 58th Academy Awards, but was not accepted as a nominee.

Apart from the original version of the film, there is also a cartoon version that was produced by Goro Miyazaki at the Studio Ghibli. The storyline in the animation is similar to that in the original film.

September 6, 2021 it was announced that a live action TV series is planned to be produced. Hans Rosenfeldt writes the script while Lisa James Larsson directs the series, and Tusse Lande is the Casting Director. Twelve episodes, divided into two seasons, have been ordered. The series is produced by Filmlance Productions, the company behind popular Swedish TV-series such as Beck, Bron, Caliphate.

Plot
Ronja, daughter of robber-chief Mattis becomes friends with Birk Borkasson. His father, robber-chief Borka, is the main rival and fiercest enemy of Ronja's father.

The film opens at the castle of Mattis (Börje Ahlstedt, Ronia’s father) and Lovis (Lena Nyman, Ronia’s mother). A terrible thunderstorm rages about the castle as Lovis is giving birth to Ronja (Hanna Zetterberg). Minutes after the baby is born lightning strikes the castle and splits away of part of the castle, creating a deep rift in the rock below. 
The movie is then fast forwarded to ten years later when Ronia is old enough to explore the wilderness and learn how to deal with the dangers out there. 
Mattis is the head of a band of good-natured robbers, and he warns his daughter of the dangers that she is likely to meet in the wilderness. Nonetheless, Ronia sets out on the adventure and encounters the various creatures and dangers as already told by her father.

Meanwhile another group of robbers, led by their chief Borka have settled in the now separated part of the castle, much to the dismay of Mattis. He is even more angered by his rival Borka roaming around the forests which Mattis claims as his own territory and even robbing away Matti's loot in one instance. Consequently, Mattis hatches a plan to drive Borka’s people away from the woodland.

Borka has a son, Birk (Dan Håfström) who happens to have been born the very same thundery night that Ronia was born. There is some initial eminent enmity between Birk and Ronia when they meet first, but after saving Ronia, who got her foot stuck in an earth hole, the two eventually become friends and share some adventures together. But their friendship must be kept secret as their parents would never allow a connection to the rivaling clan.
Though separated by the constant hatred between their parents, the two reunite a couple of times.

When Mattis kidnaps Birk to force Borka’s group away, Ronia turns herself in as ransom to Borka's clan in order to get Birk returned to his family. Mattis is hurt by his daughter's action and denies his daughter. This act forces Birk and Ronia to run away from their families, living in a cave, as their parents refuse to get over their enmity. Eventually Mattis comes to visit the children in the cave and apologises for his foolishness and having cast away his daughter.

The clans  organise a fight against each other to settle their dispute once and for all and Mattis is victorious. After the fight the enemy clans finally make up and have a feast in Mattis's part of the castle

Cast
Hanna Zetterberg as Ronja
Dan Håfström as Birk (also as Dick Håfström)
Börje Ahlstedt as Mattis
Lena Nyman as Lovis
Per Oscarsson as Borka
Med Reventberg as Undis
Allan Edwall as Skalle-Per
Ulf Isenborg as Fjosok
Henry Ottenby as Knotas
Björn Wallde as Sturkas
Tommy Körberg as Lill-Klippen

Reception
The film was a major success, becoming the highest-grossing 1984 film in Sweden, More than 1.5 million people attended its screenings in Sweden.

Particularly, it was viewed as a children's film owing to the fact that various media houses made it appear as a children's piece. The New York Times, for instance, wrote, “ALL those kids in New York who have been longing to see a movie in the original Swedish can now throng to the 23d Street Triplex, where ''Ronja Robbersdaughter'' opens today”. To increase the audience size, the film was reproduced as a cartoon. Espeland noted, "The story has also been made into musicals, stage plays, and an animated TV series". That shows that the film was not just appealing to the ordinary viewers, it equally impressed artists who say it as an opportunity to catch more viewers.

Adaptations in other Mediums 
The film has been adapted as a cartoon with a similar title, “Ronja, the Robber’s Daughter”. Further, there is an English dub and a lullaby, each adapted from the same film. There is also a play written by Allison Gregory that goes by the same title.

Awards and honours
The film won Reader's Jury prize of the Berliner Morgenpost. It was in competition for a Golden Bear at the 35th Berlin International Film Festival in 1985, where it was awarded a Silver Berlin Bear for outstanding artistic contribution. Additionally, the film was considered for the 58th Academy Awards as one of the best in the category of Foreign Language Films. Though it was disputed and eliminated from the list of contestants, its proposal shows that it merited to some extent.

See also
 List of submissions to the 58th Academy Awards for Best Foreign Language Film
 List of Swedish submissions for the Academy Award for Best Foreign Language Film

References

External links

1984 films
Films based on works by Astrid Lindgren
Films directed by Tage Danielsson
Films scored by Björn Isfält
Swedish fantasy films
1980s Swedish-language films
Silver Bear for outstanding artistic contribution
1984 fantasy films
Swedish children's films
1980s Swedish films